Pavich is a surname. Notable people with the surname include:

Emil Pavich (1931–2005), American politician 
Frank Pavich, Croatian-American film director and producer

See also
Pavić

Serbo-Croatian-language surnames